An aircraft carrier is a warship that serves as a seagoing airbase, equipped with a full-length flight deck and facilities for carrying, arming, deploying, and recovering aircraft. Typically, it is the capital ship of a fleet, as it allows a naval force to project air power worldwide without depending on local bases for staging aircraft operations. Carriers have evolved since their inception in the early twentieth century from wooden vessels used to deploy balloons to nuclear-powered warships that carry numerous fighters, strike aircraft, helicopters, and other types of aircraft. While heavier aircraft such as fixed-wing gunships and bombers have been launched from aircraft carriers, these aircraft have not landed on a carrier. By its diplomatic and tactical power, its mobility, its autonomy and the variety of its means, the aircraft carrier is often the centerpiece of modern combat fleets. Tactically or even strategically, it replaced the battleship in the role of flagship of a fleet. One of its great advantages is that, by sailing in international waters, it does not interfere with any territorial sovereignty and thus obviates the need for overflight authorizations from third-party countries, reduces the times and transit distances of aircraft and therefore significantly increase the time of availability on the combat zone.

There is no single definition of an "aircraft carrier", and modern navies use several variants of the type. These variants are sometimes categorized as sub-types of aircraft carriers, and sometimes as distinct types of naval aviation-capable ships. Aircraft carriers may be classified according to the type of aircraft they carry and their operational assignments. Admiral Sir Mark Stanhope, RN, former First Sea Lord (head) of the Royal Navy, has said, "To put it simply, countries that aspire to strategic international influence have aircraft carriers." Henry Kissinger, while United States Secretary of State, also said: "An aircraft carrier is 100,000 tons of diplomacy."

The United States Navy has 11 large nuclear-powered fleet carriers—carrying around 80 fighters each—the largest carriers in the world; the total combined deck space is over twice that of all other nations combined. As well as the aircraft carrier fleet, the US Navy has nine amphibious assault ships used primarily for helicopters, although these also each carry up to 20 vertical or short take-off and landing (V/STOL) fighter jets and are similar in size to medium-sized fleet carriers. The United Kingdom, India and China each operate two aircraft carriers. France and Russia each operate a single aircraft carrier with a capacity of 30 to 60 fighters. Italy operates two light V/STOL carriers and Spain operates one V/STOL aircraft-carrying assault ship. Helicopter carriers are operated by Japan (4, two of which are being converted to operate V/STOL fighters), France (3), Australia (2), Egypt (2), South Korea (2), China (3), Thailand (1) and Brazil (1). Future aircraft carriers are under construction or in planning by China, France, India, Russia, South Korea, Turkey, and the US.

Types of carriers

General features
 Speed is a crucial attribute for aircraft carriers, as they need to be able to be deployed quickly anywhere in the world and have to be fast enough to evade detection and targeting from enemy forces. A high speed also increases the "wind over the deck," boosting the lift available for fixed-wing aircraft to carry fuel and ammunition. In order to evade nuclear submarines, the carriers should have a speed of more than 30 knots.
 Aircraft carriers are among the largest types of warships due to their need for ample deck space.
 An aircraft carrier must be able to perform increasingly diverse mission sets. Diplomacy, power projection, quick crisis response force, land attack from the sea, sea base for helicopter and amphibious assault forces, anti-surface warfare (ASUW), Defensive Counter Air (DCA), and humanitarian aid disaster relief (HADR) are some of the missions the aircraft carrier is expected to accomplish. Traditionally an aircraft carrier is supposed to be one ship that can perform at least power projection and sea control missions.
 An aircraft carrier must be able to efficiently operate an air combat group. This means it should handle fixed-wing jets as well as helicopters. This includes ships designed to support operations of short-takeoff/vertical-landing (STOVL) jets.

Basic types
 Aircraft cruiser
 Amphibious assault ship and sub-types
 Anti-submarine warfare carrier
 Balloon carrier and balloon tenders
 Escort carrier
 Fleet carrier
 Flight deck cruiser
 Helicopter carrier
 Light aircraft carrier
 Sea Control Ship
 Seaplane tender and seaplane carriers
 Utility carrier: This type was mainly used in the US Navy, in the decade after World War 2. 

Some of the types listed here are not strictly defined as aircraft carriers by some sources.

By role

A fleet carrier is intended to operate with the main fleet and usually provides an offensive capability. These are the largest carriers capable of fast speeds. By comparison, escort carriers were developed to provide defense for convoys of ships. They were smaller and slower with lower numbers of aircraft carried. Most were built from mercantile hulls or, in the case of merchant aircraft carriers, were bulk cargo ships with a flight deck added on top. Light aircraft carriers were fast enough to operate with the main fleet but of smaller size with reduced aircraft capacity.

The Soviet aircraft carrier Admiral Kusnetsov was termed a "heavy aircraft-carrying cruiser". This was primarily a legal construct to avoid the limitations of the Montreux Convention preventing 'aircraft carriers' transiting the Turkish Straits between the Soviet Black Sea bases and the Mediterranean Sea. These ships, while sized in the range of large fleet carriers, were designed to deploy alone or with escorts. In addition to supporting fighter aircraft and helicopters, they provide both strong defensive weaponry and heavy offensive missiles equivalent to a guided-missile cruiser.

By configuration

Aircraft carriers today are usually divided into the following four categories based on the way that aircraft take off and land:
Catapult-assisted take-off barrier-arrested recovery (CATOBAR): these carriers generally carry the largest, heaviest, and most heavily armed aircraft, although smaller CATOBAR carriers may have other limitations (weight capacity of aircraft elevator, etc.). All CATOBAR carriers in service today are nuclear powered. Twelve are in service: ten Nimitz and one  fleet carriers in the United States; and one medium-sized carrier in France.
 Short take-off barrier-arrested recovery (STOBAR): these carriers are generally limited to carrying lighter fixed-wing aircraft with more limited payloads. Five are in service: two in China; two in India and one in Russia.
 Short take-off vertical-landing (STOVL): limited to carrying STOVL aircraft. STOVL aircraft, such as the Harrier family and Yakovlev Yak-38 generally have limited payloads, lower performance, and high fuel consumption when compared with conventional fixed-wing aircraft; however, a new generation of STOVL aircraft, currently consisting of the Lockheed Martin F-35B Lightning II, has much improved performance. Fourteen are in service; nine STOVL amphibious assault ships in the US; two carriers each in Italy and the UK; and one STOVL amphibious assault ship in Spain.
 Helicopter carrier: Helicopter carriers have a similar appearance to other aircraft carriers but operate only helicopters – those that mainly operate helicopters but can also operate fixed-wing aircraft are known as STOVL carriers (see above). Seventeen are in service: four in Japan; three in France; two each in Australia, China, Egypt and South Korea; and one each in Brazil and Thailand. In the past, some conventional carriers were converted and these were called "commando carriers" by the Royal Navy. Some helicopter carriers, but not all, are classified as amphibious assault ships, tasked with landing and supporting ground forces on enemy territory.

By size
 Fleet carrier
 Light aircraft carrier
 Escort carrier

Supercarrier

The appellation "supercarrier" is not an official designation with any national navy, but a term used predominantly by the media and typically when reporting on larger and more advanced carrier types. It is also used when comparing carriers of various sizes and capabilities, both current and past. Since then, aircraft carriers have consistently grown in size, both in length and displacement, as well as improved capabilities; in defense, sensors, electronic warfare, propulsion, range, launch and recovery systems, number and types of aircraft carried and number of sorties flown per day.

Hull type identification symbols
Several systems of identification symbol for aircraft carriers and related types of ship have been used. These include the pennant numbers used by the Royal Navy, Commonwealth countries, and Europe, along with the hull classification symbols used by the US and Canada.

History

Origins

The 1903 advent of the heavier-than-air fixed-wing airplane with the Wright brothers' first flight at Kitty Hawk, North Carolina, was closely followed on 14 November 1910, by Eugene Burton Ely's first experimental take-off of a Curtiss Pusher airplane from the deck of a United States Navy ship, the cruiser  anchored off Norfolk Navy Base in Virginia. Two months later, on 18 January 1911, Ely landed his Curtiss Pusher airplane on a platform on the armored cruiser  anchored in San Francisco Bay. On 9 May 1912, the first take off of an airplane from a ship while underway was made by Commander Charles Samson flying a Short Improved S.27 biplane "S.38" of the Royal Naval Air Service (RNAS) from the deck of the Royal Navy's pre-dreadnought battleship , thus providing the first practical demonstration of the aircraft carrier for naval operations at sea. Seaplane tender support ships came next, with the French  of 1911.

Early in World War I, the Imperial Japanese Navy ship  conducted the world's first successful ship-launched air raid: on 6 September 1914, a Farman aircraft launched by Wakamiya attacked the Austro-Hungarian cruiser  and the Imperial German gunboat Jaguar in Kiaochow Bay off Tsingtao; neither was hit. The first attack using an air-launched torpedo occurred on 2 August, when a torpedo was fired by Flight Commander Charles H. K. Edmonds from a Short Type 184 seaplane, launched from the seaplane carrier .

The first carrier-launched airstrike was the Tondern raid in July 1918. Seven Sopwith Camels were launched from the battlecruiser  which had been modified by replacing her forward turret with a flight deck and hangar turret. The Camels attacked and damaged the German airbase at Tondern, Germany (modern day Tønder, Denmark) and destroyed two zeppelin airships.

The first landing of an airplane on a moving ship was by Squadron Commander Edwin Harris Dunning, when he landed his Sopwith Pup on HMS Furious in Scapa Flow, Orkney on 2 August 1917. Landing on the forward flight deck required the pilot to approach round the ship's superstructure, a difficult and dangerous manoeuver and Dunning was later killed when his airplane was thrown overboard while attempting another landing on Furious. HMS Furious was modified again when her rear turret was removed and another flight deck added over a second hangar for landing aircraft over the stern. Her funnel and superstructure remained intact however and turbulence from the funnel and superstructure was severe enough that only three landing attempts were successful before further attempts were forbidden. This experience prompted the development of vessels with a flush deck and produced the first large fleet ships. In 1918,  became the world's first carrier capable of launching and recovering naval aircraft.

As a result of the Washington Naval Treaty of 1922, which limited the construction of new heavy surface combat ships, most early aircraft carriers were conversions of ships that were laid down (or had served) as different ship types: cargo ships, cruisers, battlecruisers, or battleships. Specialist carrier evolution was well underway, with several navies ordering and building warships that were purposefully designed to function as aircraft carriers by the mid-1920s. During World War II, these ships would become known as fleet carriers.

World War II

The aircraft carrier dramatically changed naval warfare in World War II, because air power was becoming a significant factor in warfare. The advent of aircraft as focal weapons was driven by the superior range, flexibility, and effectiveness of carrier-launched aircraft. They had greater range and precision than naval guns, making them highly effective. The versatility of the carrier was demonstrated in November 1940, when  launched a long-range strike on the Italian fleet at their base in Taranto, signalling the beginning of the effective and highly mobile aircraft strikes. This operation in the shallow water harbor incapacitated three of the six anchored battleships at a cost of two torpedo bombers.

World War II in the Pacific Ocean involved clashes between aircraft carrier fleets. The Japanese surprise attack on the American Pacific fleet at Pearl Harbor naval and air bases on Sunday, 7 December 1941, was a clear illustration of the power projection capability afforded by a large force of modern carriers. Concentrating six carriers in a single unit turned naval history about, as no other nation had fielded anything comparable. Further versatility was demonstrated during the "Doolittle Raid", on 18 April 1942, when US Navy carrier  sailed to within  of Japan and launched 16 B-25 bombers from her deck in a retaliatory strike on the mainland, including the capital, Tokyo.

This new-found importance of naval aviation forced nations to create a number of carriers, in efforts to provide air superiority cover for every major fleet in order to ward off enemy aircraft. This extensive usage led to the development and construction of 'light' carriers. Although with similar complement to escort carriers, they had the advantage of speed from their converted cruiser hulls. The UK 1942 Design Light Fleet Carrier was designed for building quickly by civilian shipyards and with an expected service life of about 3 years. They served the Royal Navy during the war, and the hull design was chosen for nearly all aircraft carrier equipped navies after the war, until the 1980s. Emergencies also spurred the creation or conversion of highly unconventional aircraft carriers. CAM ships were cargo-carrying merchant ships that could launch (but not retrieve) a single fighter aircraft from a catapult to defend the convoy from long range land-based German aircraft.

Postwar era

Before World War II, international naval treaties of 1922, 1930, and 1936 limited the size of capital ships including carriers. Since World War II, aircraft carrier designs have increased in size to accommodate a steady increase in aircraft size. The large, modern  of US Navy carriers has a displacement nearly four times that of the World War II–era , yet its complement of aircraft is roughly the same—a consequence of the steadily increasing size and weight of individual military aircraft over the years. Today's aircraft carriers are so expensive that some nations which operate them risk significant economic and military impact if a carrier is lost.

Some changes were made after 1945 in carriers:
 The angled flight deck was invented by Royal Navy Captain (later Rear Admiral) Dennis Cambell, as naval aviation jets higher speeds required carriers be modified to "fit" their needs. Additionally, the angled flight deck allows for simultaneous launch and recovery.
 Jet blast deflectors became necessary to protect aircraft and handlers from jet blast. The first US Navy carriers to be fitted with them were the wooden-decked s which were adapted to operate jets in the late 1940s. Later versions had to be water-cooled because of increasing engine power.
 Optical landing systems were developed to facilitate the very precise landing angles required by jet aircraft, which have a fast landing speed giving little time to correct mistakes.
 Aircraft carrier designs have increased in size to accommodate continuous increase in aircraft size. The 1950s saw US Navy's commission of "supercarriers", designed to operate naval jets, which offered better performance at the expense of bigger size and demanded more ordnance to be carried on-board (fuel, spare parts, electronics, etc.).
 Increase in size and requirements of being capable of more than 30 knots and to be at sea for long periods meant nuclear reactors are now used by aboard larger aircraft carriers to generate the steam used to produce power for propulsion, electric power, catapulting airplanes in aircraft carriers, and a few more minor uses.

Modern navies that operate such aircraft carriers treat them as capital ships of fleets, a role previously held by the sailing galleons, frigates and ships-of-the-line and later steam or diesel powered battleships. This change took place during World War II in response to air power becoming a significant factor in warfare, driven by the superior range, flexibility and effectiveness of carrier-launched aircraft. Following the war, carrier operations continued to increase in size and importance, and along with, carrier designs also increased in size and ability. Some of these larger carriers, dubbed by the media as "supercarriers", displacing 75,000 tonnes or greater, have become the pinnacle of carrier development. Some are powered by nuclear reactors and form the core of a fleet designed to operate far from home. Also known as "commando carriers" or "helicopter carriers", many have the capability to operate VSTOL aircraft.

The threatening role of aircraft carriers has a place in modern asymmetric warfare, like the gunboat diplomacy of the past. Carriers also facilitate quick and precise projections of overwhelming military power into such local and regional conflicts.

Lacking the firepower of other warships, carriers by themselves are considered vulnerable to attack by other ships, aircraft, submarines, or missiles. Therefore, an aircraft carrier is generally accompanied by a number of other ships to provide protection for the relatively unwieldy carrier, to carry supplies and perform other support services, and to provide additional offensive capabilities. The resulting group of ships is often termed a battle group, carrier group, carrier battle group or carrier strike group.

There is a view among some military pundits that modern anti-ship weapons systems, such as torpedoes and missiles, or even ballistic missiles with nuclear warheads have made aircraft carriers and carrier groups too vulnerable for modern combat.

 like the German U24 of the conventional 206 class which in 2001 "fired" at the Enterprise during the exercise JTFEX 01-2 in the Caribbean Sea by firing flares and taking a photograph through its periscope or the Swedish Gotland which managed the same feat in 2006 during JTFEX 06-2 by penetrating the defensive measures of Carrier Strike Group 7 which was protecting .

Description

Structure
Carriers are large and long ships, although there is a high degree of variation depending on their intended role and aircraft complement. The size of the carrier has varied over history and among navies, to cater to the various roles that global climates have demanded from naval aviation.

Regardless of size, the ship itself must house their complement of aircraft, with space for launching, storing, and maintaining them. Space is also required for the large crew, supplies (food, munitions, fuel, engineering parts), and propulsion. US aircraft carriers are notable for having nuclear reactors powering their systems and propulsion.

The top of the carrier is the flight deck, where aircraft are launched and recovered. On the starboard side of this is the island, where the funnel, air-traffic control and the bridge are located.

The constraints of constructing a flight deck affect the role of a given carrier strongly, as they influence the weight, type, and configuration of the aircraft that may be launched. For example, assisted launch mechanisms are used primarily for heavy aircraft, especially those loaded with air-to-ground weapons. CATOBAR is most commonly used on US Navy fleet carriers as it allows the deployment of heavy jets with full load-outs, especially on ground-attack missions. STOVL is used by other navies because it is cheaper to operate and still provides good deployment capability for fighter aircraft.

Due to the busy nature of the flight deck, only 20 or so aircraft may be on it at any one time. A hangar storage several decks below the flight deck is where most aircraft are kept, and aircraft are taken from the lower storage decks to the flight deck through the use of an elevator. The hangar is usually quite large and can take up several decks of vertical space.

Munitions are commonly stored on the lower decks because they are highly explosive. Usually this is below the waterline so that the area can be flooded in case of emergency.

Flight deck

As "runways at sea", aircraft carriers have a flat-top flight deck, which launches and recovers aircraft. Aircraft launch forward, into the wind, and are recovered from astern. The flight deck is where the most notable differences between a carrier and a land runway are found. Creating such a surface at sea poses constraints on the carrier. For example, the size of the vessel is a fundamental limitation on runway length. This affects take-off procedure, as a shorter runway length of the deck requires that aircraft accelerate more quickly to gain lift. This either requires a thrust boost, a vertical component to its velocity, or a reduced take-off load (to lower mass). The differing types of deck configuration, as above, influence the structure of the flight deck. The form of launch assistance a carrier provides is strongly related to the types of aircraft embarked and the design of the carrier itself.

There are two main philosophies in order to keep the deck short: add thrust to the aircraft, such as using a Catapult Assisted Take-Off (CATO-); and changing the direction of the airplanes' thrust, as in Vertical and/or Short Take-Off (V/STO-). Each method has advantages and disadvantages of its own:
 Catapult assisted take-off but arrested recovery (CATOBAR): A steam- or electric-powered catapult is connected to the aircraft, and is used to accelerate conventional aircraft to a safe flying speed. By the end of the catapult stroke, the aircraft is airborne and further propulsion is provided by its own engines. This is the most expensive method as it requires complex machinery to be installed under the flight deck, but allows for even heavily loaded aircraft to take off.
 Short take-off but arrested recovery (STOBAR) depends on increasing the net lift on the aircraft. Aircraft do not require catapult assistance for take off; instead on nearly all ships of this type an upwards vector is provided by a ski-jump at the forward end of the flight deck, often combined with thrust vectoring by the aircraft. Alternatively, by reducing the fuel and weapon load, an aircraft is able to reach faster speeds and generate more upwards lift and launch without a ski-jump or catapult.
 Short take-off vertical-landing (STOVL): On aircraft carriers, non-catapult-assisted, fixed-wing short takeoffs are accomplished with the use of thrust vectoring, which may also be used in conjunction with a runway "ski-jump". Use of STOVL tends to allow aircraft to carry a larger payload as compared to during VTOL use, while still only requiring a short runway. The most famous examples are the Hawker Siddeley Harrier and the BAe Sea Harrier. Although technically VTOL aircraft, they are operationally STOVL aircraft due to the extra weight carried at take-off for fuel and armaments. The same is true of the Lockheed F-35B Lightning II, which demonstrated VTOL capability in test flights but is operationally STOVL or in the case of UK uses "shipborne rolling vertical landing" 
 Vertical take-off and landing (VTOL): Certain aircraft are specifically designed for the purpose of using very high degrees of thrust vectoring (e.g. if the thrust to weight-force ratio is greater than 1, it can take off vertically), but are usually slower than conventionally propelled aircraft due to the additional weight from associated systems.

On the recovery side of the flight deck, the adaptation to the aircraft load-out is mirrored. Non-VTOL or conventional aircraft cannot decelerate on their own, and almost all carriers using them must have arrested-recovery systems (-BAR, e.g. CATOBAR or STOBAR) to recover their aircraft. Aircraft that are landing extend a tailhook that catches on arrestor wires stretched across the deck to bring themselves to a stop in a short distance. Post-World War II Royal Navy research on safer CATOBAR recovery eventually led to universal adoption of a landing area angled off axis to allow aircraft who missed the arresting wires to "bolt" and safely return to flight for another landing attempt rather than crashing into aircraft on the forward deck.

If the aircraft are VTOL-capable or helicopters, they do not need to decelerate and hence there is no such need. The arrested-recovery system has used an angled deck since the 1950s because, in case the aircraft does not catch the arresting wire, the short deck allows easier take off by reducing the number of objects between the aircraft and the end of the runway. It also has the advantage of separating the recovery operation area from the launch area. Helicopters and aircraft capable of vertical or short take-off and landing (V/STOL) usually recover by coming abreast of the carrier on the port side and then using their hover capability to move over the flight deck and land vertically without the need for arresting gear.

Staff and deck operations

Carriers steam at speed, up to  into the wind during flight deck operations to increase wind speed over the deck to a safe minimum. This increase in effective wind speed provides a higher launch airspeed for aircraft at the end of the catapult stroke or ski-jump, as well as making recovery safer by reducing the difference between the relative speeds of the aircraft and ship.

Since the early 1950s on conventional carriers it has been the practice to recover aircraft at an angle to port of the axial line of the ship. The primary function of this angled deck is to allow aircraft that miss the arresting wires, referred to as a bolter, to become airborne again without the risk of hitting aircraft parked forward. The angled deck allows the installation of one or two "waist" catapults in addition to the two bow cats. An angled deck also improves launch and recovery cycle flexibility with the option of simultaneous launching and recovery of aircraft.

Conventional ("tailhook") aircraft rely upon a landing signal officer (LSO, radio call sign 'paddles') to monitor the aircraft's approach, visually gauge glideslope, attitude, and airspeed, and transmit that data to the pilot. Before the angled deck emerged in the 1950s, LSOs used colored paddles to signal corrections to the pilot (hence the nickname). From the late 1950s onward, visual landing aids such as the optical landing system have provided information on proper glide slope, but LSOs still transmit voice calls to approaching pilots by radio.

Key personnel involved in the flight deck include the shooters, the handler, and the air boss. Shooters are naval aviators or naval flight officers and are responsible for launching aircraft. The handler works just inside the island from the flight deck and is responsible for the movement of aircraft before launching and after recovery. The "air boss" (usually a commander) occupies the top bridge (Primary Flight Control, also called primary or the tower) and has the overall responsibility for controlling launch, recovery and "those aircraft in the air near the ship, and the movement of planes on the flight deck, which itself resembles a well-choreographed ballet." The captain of the ship spends most of his time one level below primary on the Navigation Bridge. Below this is the Flag Bridge, designated for the embarked admiral and his staff.

To facilitate working on the flight deck of a US aircraft carrier, the sailors wear colored shirts that designate their responsibilities. There are at least seven different colors worn by flight deck personnel for modern United States Navy carrier air operations. Carrier operations of other nations use similar color schemes.

Deck structures

While the island is usually built on the starboard side of the flight deck, the Japanese aircraft carriers  and  had their islands built on the port side. Very few carriers have been designed or built without an island. The flush deck configuration proved to have significant drawbacks, primary of which was management of the exhaust from the power plant. In addition, lack of an island meant difficulties managing the flight deck, performing air traffic control, a lack of radar housing placements and problems with navigating and controlling the ship itself.

Another deck structure that can be seen is a ski-jump ramp at the forward end of the flight deck. This was first developed to help launch short take off vertical landing (STOVL) aircraft take off at far higher weights than is possible with a vertical or rolling takeoff on flat decks. Originally developed by the Royal Navy, it since has been adopted by many navies for smaller carriers. A ski-jump ramp works by converting some of the forward rolling movement of the aircraft into vertical velocity and is sometimes combined with the aiming of jet thrust partly downwards. This allows heavily loaded and fueled aircraft a few more precious seconds to attain sufficient air velocity and lift to sustain normal flight. Without a ski-jump, launching fully-loaded and fueled aircraft such as the Harrier would not be possible on a smaller flat deck ship before either stalling out or crashing directly into the sea.

Although STOVL aircraft are capable of taking off vertically from a spot on the deck, using the ramp and a running start is far more fuel efficient and permits a heavier launch weight. As catapults are unnecessary, carriers with this arrangement reduce weight, complexity, and space needed for complex steam or electromagnetic launching equipment. Vertical landing aircraft also remove the need for arresting cables and related hardware. Russian, Chinese, and  Indian carriers include a ski-jump ramp for launching lightly loaded conventional fighter aircraft but recover using traditional carrier arresting cables and a tailhook on their aircraft.

The disadvantage of the ski-jump is the penalty it exacts on aircraft size, payload, and fuel load (and thus range); heavily laden aircraft can not launch using a ski-jump because their high loaded weight requires either a longer takeoff roll than is possible on a carrier deck, or assistance from a catapult or JATO rocket. For example, the Russian Sukhoi Su-33 is only able to launch from the carrier  with a minimal armament and fuel load. Another disadvantage is on mixed flight deck operations where helicopters are also present, such as on a US landing helicopter dock or landing helicopter assault amphibious assault ship. A ski jump is not included as this would eliminate one or more helicopter landing areas; this flat deck limits the loading of Harriers but is somewhat mitigated by the longer rolling start provided by a long flight deck compared to many STOVL carriers.

National fleets

The US Navy has the largest fleet of carriers in the world, with eleven supercarriers currently in service. China and India each have two STOBAR carriers in service. The UK has two STOVL carriers in service. The navies of France and Russia each operate a single medium-sized carrier. The US also has nine similarly sized Amphibious Warfare Ships. There are five small light carriers in use capable of operating both fixed-wing aircraft and helicopters; Japan and Italy each operate two, and Spain one.

Additionally there are seventeen small carriers which only operate helicopters serving the navies of Australia (2), Brazil (1), China (2), Egypt (2), France (3), Japan (4), South Korea (2), and Thailand (1).

Algeria
Current

Kalaat Béni Abbès (L-474) is an amphibious transport dock of the Algerian National Navy with two deck-landing spots for helicopters.

Australia
Current

The Royal Australian Navy operates two s. The two-ship class, based on the Spanish vessel  and built by Navantia and BAE Systems Australia, represents the largest ships ever built for the Royal Australian Navy.

 underwent sea trials in late 2013 and was commissioned in 2014. Her sister ship, was commissioned in December 2015. The Australian ships retain the ski-ramp from the Juan Carlos I design, although the RAN has not acquired carrier-based fixed-wing aircraft.

Brazil
Current
The ship was decommissioned from Royal Navy service in March 2018. The Brazilian Navy commissioned the carrier on 29 June 2018 in the United Kingdom. After undertaking a period of maintenance in the UK, the ship travelled to its new home port, Arsenal de Marinha do Rio de Janeiro (AMRJ) in order to be fully operational by 2020.

Before leaving HMNB Devonport for her new homeport in Rio's AMRJ, Atlântico underwent operational sea training under the Royal Navy's Flag Officer Sea Training (FOST) program.

On 12 November 2020, Atlântico was redesignated "NAM", for "multipurpose aircraft carrier", from "PHM", for "multipurpose helicopter carrier", to reflect the ship's capability to operate with fixed-wing medium-altitude long-endurance unmanned aerial vehicles as well as crewed tiltrotor VTOL aircraft.

China

Current
2 STOBAR carriers:
  (60,900 tons) was originally built as the Soviet  carrier Varyag and was later purchased as a hulk in 1998 on the pretext of use as a floating casino, then towed to China for rebuild and completion. Liaoning was commissioned on 25 September 2012 and began service for testing and training. In November 2012, Liaoning launched and recovered Shenyang J-15 naval fighter aircraft for the first time. After a refit in January 2019, she was assigned to the North Sea Fleet, a change from her previous role as a training carrier.
  (60,000-70,000 tons) was launched on 26 April 2017. She is the first to be built domestically, to an improved Kuznetsov-class design. Shandong started sea trials on 23 April 2018, and entered service in December 2019.
1 CATOBAR carrier:
  (80,000 tons) is China's only CATOBAR carrier that underwent construction between 2015 and 2016 before being completed in June 2022. She is being fitted out as of 2022 and will commence in-service in 2023–2024. 
2 Landing helicopter docks
A Type 075 LHD,  was commissioned on 23 April 2021 at the naval base in Sanya. A second ship, Guangxi, was commissioned on 26 December 2021.

Future
China has had a long-term plan to operate six large aircraft carriers with two carriers per fleet.

China is planning a class of eight landing helicopter dock vessels, the Type 075 (NATO reporting name Yushen-class landing helicopter assault). This is a class of amphibious assault ship under construction by the Hudong–Zhonghua Shipbuilding company. The first ship was commissioned in April 2021. China is also planning a modified class of the same concept, the Type 076 landing helicopter dock, that will also be equipped with an electromagnetic catapult launch system.

Egypt
Current
Egypt signed a contract with French shipbuilder DCNS to buy two  helicopter carriers for approximately 950 million euros. The two ships were originally destined for Russia, but the deal was cancelled by France due to Russian involvement in Ukraine.

On 2 June 2016, Egypt received the first of two helicopter carriers acquired in October 2015, the landing helicopter dock . The flag transfer ceremony took place in the presence of Egyptian and French Navies' chiefs of staff, chairman and chief executive officers of both DCNS and STX France, and senior Egyptian and French officials. On 16 September 2016, DCNS delivered the second of two helicopter carriers, the landing helicopter dock  which also participated in a joint military exercise with the French Navy before arriving at her home port of Alexandria.

Egypt is so far the only country in Africa or the Middle East to possess a helicopter carrier.

France

Current
The French Navy operates the 42,000-tonne nuclear-powered aircraft carrier, . Commissioned in 2001, she is the flagship of the French Navy. The ship carries a complement of Dassault Rafale M and E-2C Hawkeye aircraft, EC725 Caracal and AS532 Cougar helicopters for combat search and rescue, as well as modern electronics and Aster missiles. She is a CATOBAR-type carrier that uses two 75 m C13-3 steam catapults of a shorter version of the catapult system installed on the US  carriers, one catapult at the bow and one across the front of the landing area. In addition, the French Navy operates three s.

Future
In October 2018, the French Ministry of Defence began an 18-month study for €40 million for the eventual future replacement of the  beyond 2030. In December 2020, President Macron announced that construction of the next generation carrier would begin in around 2025 with sea trials to start in about 2036. The carrier is planned to have a displacement of around 75,000 tons and to carry about 32 next-generation fighters, two to three E-2D Advanced Hawkeyes and a yet-to-be-determined number of unmanned carrier air vehicles.

India

Current
2 STOBAR carriers: 

, 45,400 tonnes, modified Kiev class. The carrier was purchased by India on 20 January 2004 after years of negotiations at a final price of $2.35 billion. The ship successfully completed her sea trials in July 2013 and aviation trials in September 2013. She was formally commissioned on 16 November 2013 at a ceremony held at Severodvinsk, Russia.

, also known as Indigenous Aircraft Carrier 1 (IAC-1) a 45,000-tonne,  aircraft carrier whose keel was laid in 2009. The new carrier will operate MiG-29K and naval HAL Tejas aircraft. The ship was launched in 2013, sea-trials began in August 2021 and was commissioned on 02 September 2022.

Future
India has plans for a third carrier, also known as Indigenous Aircraft Carrier 2 (IAC-2) with a displacement of over 65,000 tonnes and is planned with a CATOBAR system to launch and recover heavier aircraft.

India has also issued a request for information (RFI) to procure four Landing helicopter dock displacing 30,000-40,000 tons with a capacity to operate 12 medium lift special ops and two heavy lift helicopters and troops for amphibious operations.

Italy

Current
2 STOVL carriers:
 : 14,000-tonne Italian STOVL carrier, commissioned in 1985.
 : 30000-tonne Italian STOVL carrier designed and built with secondary amphibious assault facilities, commissioned in 2008.

Future
Italy plans to replace ageing aircraft carrier Giuseppe Garibaldi, as well as one of the  landing helicopter docks, with a new amphibious 'assault ship, to be named . The ship will be significantly larger than her predecessors with a displacement of 38,000 tonnes at full load. Trieste is to carry the F-35B Joint Strike Fighter. Meanwhile, Giuseppe Garibaldi will be transferred to Italian Space Operation Command for use as a satellite launch platform.

Japan

Current
 2 s – , 19,500-tonne (27,000 tonnes full load) STOVL carrier Izumo was launched August 2013 and commissioned March 2015. Izumos sister ship, Kaga, was commissioned in 2017.
In December 2018, the Japanese Cabinet gave approval to convert both Izumo-class destroyers into aircraft carriers for F-35B STOVL operations. The conversion of Izumo was underway as of mid-2020. The modification of maritime escort vessels is to "increase operational flexibility" and enhance Pacific air defense, the Japanese defense ministry's position is "We are not creating carrier air wings or carrier air squadrons" similar to the US Navy. The Japanese STOVL F-35s, when delivered, will be operated by the Japan Air Self Defense Force from land bases; according to the 2020 Japanese Defense Ministry white paper the STOVL model was chosen for the JASDF due the lack of appropriately long runways to support air superiority capability across all of Japanese airspace. Japan has requested that the USMC deploy STOVL F-35s and crews aboard the Izumo-class ships "for cooperation and advice on how to operate the fighter on the deck of the modified ships".
On 3 October 2021, two USMC F-35Bs performed the first vertical landings and horizontal take-offs from JS Izumo, marking 75 years since fixed-wing aircraft operated from a Japanese carrier.

 2 s – 19,000-tonne (full load) anti-submarine warfare carriers with enhanced command-and-control capabilities allowing them to serve as fleet flagships.

Russia

Current
1 STOBAR carrier: Admiral Flota Sovetskogo Soyuza Kuznetsov: 55,000-tonne  STOBAR aircraft carrier. Launched in 1985 as Tbilisi, renamed and operational from 1995. Without catapults she can launch and recover lightly fueled naval fighters for air defense or anti-ship missions but not heavy conventional bombing strikes. Officially designated an aircraft carrying cruiser, she is unique in carrying a heavy cruiser's complement of defensive weapons and large P-700 Granit offensive missiles. The P-700 systems will be removed in the coming refit to enlarge her below decks aviation facilities as well as upgrading her defensive systems.

Future
The Russian Government has been considering the potential replacement of Admiral Kuznetsov for some time and has considered the Shtorm-class aircraft carrier as a possible option. This carrier will be a hybrid of CATOBAR and STOBAR, given the fact that she utilizes both systems of launching aircraft. The carrier is expected to cost . As of 2020, the project had not yet been approved and, given the financial costs, it was unclear whether it would be made a priority over other elements of Russian naval modernization.

A class of 2 LHD, Project 23900 is planned and an official keel laying ceremony for the project happened on 20 July 2020.

South Korea
Current
Two  18,860-tonne full deck amphibious assault ships with hospital and well deck and facilities to serve as fleet flagships.

Future
South Korea has set tentative plans for procuring two light aircraft carriers by 2033, which would help make the ROKN a blue water navy. In December 2020, details of South Korea's planned carrier program (CVX) were finalized. A vessel of about 40,000 tons is envisaged carrying about 20 F-35B fighters as well as future maritime attack helicopters. Service entry had been anticipated in the early 2030s. The program has encountered opposition in the National Assembly. In November 2021, the National Defense Committee of the National Assembly reduced the program's requested budget of 7.2 billion KRW and to just 500 million KRW (about $400K USD), effectively putting the project on hold, at least temporarily. However, on 3 December 2021 the full budget of 7.2 billion won was passed by the National Assembly. Basic design work is to begin in earnest starting 2022.

Spain

Current
: 27,000-tonne, specially designed multipurpose strategic projection ship which can operate as an amphibious assault ship and aircraft carrier. Juan Carlos I has full facilities for both functions including a ski jump for STOVL operations, is equipped with the AV-8B Harrier II attack aircraft. Also, well deck, and vehicle storage area which can be used as additional hangar space, launched in 2008, commissioned 30 September 2010.

Thailand

Current
1 offshore helicopter support ship:  helicopter carrier: 11,400-tonne STOVL carrier based on Spanish  design. Commissioned in 1997. The AV-8S Matador/Harrier STOVL fighter wing, mostly inoperable by 1999, was retired from service without replacement in 2006. As of 2010, the ship is used for helicopter operations and for disaster relief.

Turkey

Future
 is a 27,079-tonne amphibious assault ship (LHD) of the Turkish Navy that can be configured as a 24,660-tonne V/STOL aircraft carrier. Construction began on 30 April 2016 by Sedef Shipbuilding Inc. at their Istanbul shipyard and the ship was expected to be commissioned in December 2022, but was still undergoing sea trials at the end of the year. The construction of a sister ship, to be named TCG Trakya, is currently being planned by the Turkish Navy.

The Baykar MIUS Kızılelma, a newly designed, jet-engined UCAV, will operate from Anadolu. Its maiden flight was successfully completed on December 14, 2022.

United Kingdom

Current

Queen Elizabeth undertook her first operational deployment in 2021. Each Queen Elizabeth-class ship is able to operate around 40 aircraft during peacetime operations and is thought to be able to carry up to 72 at maximum capacity. As of the end of April 2020, 18 F-35B aircraft had been delivered to the Royal Navy and the Royal Air Force. "Full operating capability" for the UK's carrier strike capability had been planned for 2023 (2 squadrons or 24 jets operating from one carrier). The longer-term aim remains for the ability to conduct a wide range of air operations and support amphibious operations worldwide from both carriers by 2026. They form the central part of the UK Carrier Strike Group.

Future
The Queen Elizabeth-class ships are expected to have service lives of 50 years.

United States

Current
11 CATOBAR carriers, all nuclear-powered:
: ten 101,000-tonne,  fleet carriers, the first of which was commissioned in 1975. A Nimitz-class carrier is powered by two nuclear reactors providing steam to four steam turbines. 
, one 100,000-tonne,  fleet carrier. The lead of the class  came into service in 2017, with another nine planned to replace the aging Nimitz-class ships.

Nine amphibious assault ships carrying vehicles, Marine fighters, attack and transport helicopters, and landing craft with STOVL fighters for CAS and CAP:
 : a class of 45,000-tonne amphibious assault ships, although the first two ships in this class, (Flight 0) do not have a well decks, all subsequent ships (Flight I) will have well decks. Two ships are currently  in service out of a planned 11 ships. Ships of this class can have a secondary mission as a light aircraft carrier with 20 AV-8B Harrier II, and in the future the F-35B Lightning II aircraft after unloading their Marine expeditionary unit.
 : a class of 41,000-tonne amphibious assault ships, members of this class have been used in wartime in their secondary mission as light carriers with 20 to 25 AV-8Bs after unloading their Marine expeditionary unit. Seven ship currently in service of an original eight, with one lost to fire.

Future
It is expected that the ships will be more automated in an effort to reduce the amount of funding required to maintain and operate the vessels. The main new features are implementation of Electromagnetic Aircraft Launch System (EMALS) (which replaces the old steam catapults) and unmanned aerial vehicles. In terms of future carrier developments, Congress has discussed the possibility of accelerating the phasing-out of one or more Nimitz-class carriers, postponing or canceling the procurement of CVN-81 and CVN-82, or modifying the purchase contract.

The House Armed Services Seapower subcommittee on 24 July 2007, recommended seven or eight new carriers (one every four years). However, the debate has deepened over budgeting for the $12–14.5 billion (plus $12 billion for development and research) for the 100,000-tonne Gerald R. Ford-class carrier (estimated service 2017) compared to the smaller $2 billion 45,000-tonne s, which are able to deploy squadrons of F-35Bs. The first of this class, is now in active service with another, and 9 more are planned.

In a report to Congress in February 2018, the Navy stated it intends to maintain a "12 CVN force" as part of its 30-year acquisition plan.

Aircraft carriers in preservation

Current museum carriers
A few aircraft carriers have been preserved as museum ships. They are:
  in Mount Pleasant, South Carolina
  in New York City
  in Alameda, California
  in Corpus Christi, Texas
  in San Diego, California
  in Tianjin, China
  in Nantong, China

Former museum carriers
  was moored as a museum in Mumbai from 2001 to 2012, but was never able to find an industrial partner and was closed that year. She was scrapped in 2014.
  was acquired for preservation and moored in New Orleans from 1990 to 2002, but due to an embezzlement scandal, funding for the museum never materialized and the ship was scrapped in 2002.

Future museum carriers
  has a preservation campaign to bring her to the West Coast of the United States as the world's first amphibious assault ship museum.

See also

 Airborne aircraft carrier
 Aviation-capable naval vessels
 Carrier-based aircraft
 Lily and Clover
 Merchant aircraft carrier
 Mobile offshore base
 Project Habakkuk
 Seadrome
 Submarine aircraft carrier
 Unsinkable aircraft carrier

Related lists

 List of aircraft carriers
 List of aircraft carriers in service
 List of aircraft carriers by configuration
 List of aircraft carriers of the Second World War
 List of sunken aircraft carriers
 List of amphibious warfare ships
 List of carrier-based aircraft
 List of Canadian Navy aircraft carriers
 List of aircraft carriers of the People's Liberation Army Navy (China)
 List of current French Navy aircraft carriers
 List of German aircraft carriers
 List of aircraft carriers of the Indian Navy
 List of Italian Navy aircraft carriers
 List of aircraft carriers of the Japanese Navy
 List of aircraft carriers of Russia and the Soviet Union
 List of active Spanish aircraft carriers
 List of aircraft carriers of the Royal Navy
 List of escort carriers of the Royal Navy
 List of seaplane carriers of the Royal Navy
 List of aircraft carriers of the United States Navy
 List of aircraft carrier classes of the United States Navy
 List of escort aircraft carriers of the United States Navy

References

Bibliography

Further reading

 Ader, Clement. Military Aviation, 1909, Edited and translated by Lee Kennett, Air University Press, Maxwell Air Force Base, Alabama, 2003, .
 Chesneau, Roger. Aircraft Carriers of the World, 1914 to the Present: An Illustrated Encyclopedia. Naval Institute Press, 1984.
 Francillon, René J, Tonkin Gulf Yacht Club US Carrier Operations off Vietnam, 1988, .
 
 
 Melhorn, Charles M. Two-Block Fox: The Rise of the Aircraft Carrier, 1911–1929. Naval Institute Press, 1974.
 Nordeen, Lon, Air Warfare in the Missile Age, 1985, .
 Polmar, Norman.  Aircraft Carriers: A History of Carrier Aviation and its Influence on World Events, 1901–2006. (two vols.) Potomac Books, 2006.
 
 Wadle, Ryan David. United States navy fleet problems and the development of carrier aviation, 1929–1933. PhD dissertation Texas A&M University, 2005. online.

External links

 - technical training film from the Royal Navy

 
Ship types
Articles containing video clips